Clarencia is a genus of beetles in the family Carabidae, containing the following species:

 Clarencia aliena (Pascoe, 1860)
 Clarencia angusticollis (Macleay, 1888)
 Clarencia breviceps Baehr, 2005
 Clarencia papua Darlington, 1968
 Clarencia quadridens Darlington, 1968

References

Lebiinae